The 1973–74 Superliga Espanola de Hockey Hielo season was the second season of the Superliga Espanola de Hockey Hielo, the top level of ice hockey in Spain. Five teams participated in the league, and Real Socieded won the championship.

Competition format
2 points for a win
1 point for a win
0 points for a loss

Teams
 FC Barcelona
 CH Jaca
 CH Madrid
 CG Puigcerdà
 Real Sociedad (champion)

Final standings

Source: El Mundo Deportivo

External links
Season on hockeyarchives.info

Spain
Liga Nacional de Hockey Hielo seasons
Liga